Marta Prat Calmet (born 24 July 1981 in Terrassa) is a Spanish field hockey player who competed in the 2004 Summer Olympics.

Notes

References

External links
 
 
 

1981 births
Living people
Spanish female field hockey players
Olympic field hockey players of Spain
Field hockey players at the 2004 Summer Olympics
Field hockey players from Catalonia
Sportspeople from Terrassa